The 2002 Peterborough City Council election took place on 2 May 2002 to elect members of Peterborough City Council in England. This was on the same day as other local elections.

Election result

Ward results

Central

Dogsthorpe

East

Eye and Thorney

Fletton

Glinton

Newborough

North Bretton

Northborough

Orton Longueville

Orton Waterville

Park

Paston

Ravensthorpe

Stanground

Werrington North

Werrington South

West

Wittering

References

2002
2000s in Cambridgeshire
Peterborough